Saleem Burki (born 14 April 1991) is a Pakistani cricketer. He made his first-class debut for Federally Administered Tribal Areas in the 2016–17 Quaid-e-Azam Trophy on 7 October 2016. He made his List A debut on 20 January 2017 for Federally Administered Tribal Areas in the 2016–17 Regional One Day Cup.

References

External links
 

1991 births
Living people
Pakistani cricketers
Federally Administered Tribal Areas cricketers